Monk's rhubarb is not a rhubarb (Rheum), but refers to certain species of the closely related docks (Rumex):

 Rumex alpinus (Alpine dock)
 Rumex patientia (patience dock)